J. A. "Jimmy" O'Bryant (c. 1896 – June 24, 1928) was an American jazz clarinetist.

Career 
O'Bryant played with the Tennessee Ten in 1920 and 1921, then in a group with Jelly Roll Morton and W. C. Handy in 1923. In 1924, he played with King Oliver. From 1923 to 1926, he recorded extensively with Lovie Austin's Blues Serenaders, and also did sessions with his own Washboard Band.  His entire output as a leader was reissued on two compact discs by RST Records in 2000 and 2001.

References
Footnotes

General references
Leonard Feather and Ira Gitler, The Biographical Encyclopedia of Jazz. Oxford, 1999, pp. 502–503.

1890s births
1928 deaths
American jazz clarinetists
Jazz-blues musicians
20th-century American musicians
Biograph Records artists